Christ Stopped at Eboli, also known as Eboli in the United States, is a 1979 drama film directed by Francesco Rosi, adapted from the book of the same name by Carlo Levi. It stars Gian Maria Volonté as Levi, a political dissident under Fascism who was exiled in the Basilicata region in Southern Italy.

The film was shown out of competition at the 1979 Cannes Film Festival and was the first to receive a BAFTA Award for Best Foreign Language Film in 1983.

It was included in the book 1001 Movies You Must See Before You Die.

Plot 

Carlo Levi is a painter and writer from Turin. He also has a degree in medicine but has never practised it. Arrested in 1935 by Mussolini's regime for anti-fascist activities, he is confined to Aliano (Gagliano in the novel), a remote town in the region of Lucania, the southern 'instep' of Italy, known today as Basilicata. While the landscape is beautiful, the peasantry are impoverished and mismanaged. They are superstitious and insular; many have emigrated to the United States in search of employment. Since the local doctors are not interested in treating peasants, Levi begins to minister to their health in response to their appeals, establishing a strong relationship with the community.

Principal cast
 Gian Maria Volonté as Carlo Levi
 Paolo Bonacelli as Don Luigi Magalone
 Alain Cuny as Baron Nicola Rotunno
 Lea Massari as Luisa Levi
 Irene Papas as Giulia Venere
 François Simon as Don Traiella
 Antonio Allocca as Don Cosimino

Production
The film was mostly shot in Basilicata in the villages of Craco, Guardia Perticara, Aliano and La Martella, near Matera. Other scenes were filmed in Gravina in Puglia and Santeramo in Colle, Apulia.

Reception

Critical response
Christ Stopped at Eboli has an approval rating of 90% on Rotten Tomatoes based on 10 reviews and an average rating of 8.10/10. AllMovie rated the film 4 stars out 5.

Accolades

References

External links 
 
 
Christ Stopped at Eboli: Memories of Exile an essay by Alexander Stille at the Criterion Collection

1979 films
French drama films
1970s Italian-language films
Italian drama films
1979 drama films
Films directed by Francesco Rosi
Films with screenplays by Tonino Guerra
Best Foreign Language Film BAFTA Award winners
Films set in 1935
Films set in 1936
Films set in Basilicata
Films shot in Matera
Films scored by Piero Piccioni
1970s Italian films
1970s French films
Films about Fascist Italy
Films based on works by Italian writers